Roque Pérez is a town in Buenos Aires Province, Argentina. It is the administrative headquarters for Roque Pérez Partido.

Notable people
 Jorge Dalto, pianist (1948–1987)

External links

 Official website
 Virtual map website

Populated places in Buenos Aires Province
Populated places established in 1913
1913 establishments in Argentina